Frank Sherwood "Sherry" Rowland (June 28, 1927 – March 10, 2012) was an American Nobel laureate and a professor of chemistry at the University of California, Irvine. His research was on atmospheric chemistry and chemical kinetics. His best-known work was the discovery that chlorofluorocarbons contribute to ozone depletion.

Education and early life
Born in Delaware, Ohio, Rowland received a majority of his education in public schools and, due to accelerated promotion was able to graduate high school several weeks before his 16th birthday. In the summers during his high school career, Frank was entrusted to run the local weather service station. This was Rowland's first exposure to systematic experimentation and data collection. After entering Ohio Wesleyan University, Rowland was about to graduate shortly before his 18th birthday. Instead, he was enlisted to the Navy to train radar operators. Rowland was discharged after 14 months as a non commissioned officer. After entering the University of Chicago, Rowland was assigned Willard F. Libby as a mentor and began to study radiochemistry. Rowland's thesis was about the chemical state of cyclotron-produced radioactive bromine atoms. Rowland received his B.A. from Ohio Wesleyan University in 1948. He then earned his M.S. in 1951 and his Ph.D. in 1952, both from the University of Chicago.

Career and research
Rowland held academic posts at Princeton University (1952–56) and at the University of Kansas (1956–64) before becoming a professor of chemistry at the University of California, Irvine, in 1964. At Irvine in the early 1970s he began working with Mario J. Molina. Rowland was elected to the National Academy of Sciences in 1978 and served as a president of American Association for the Advancement of Science (AAAS) in 1993. His best-known work was the discovery that chlorofluorocarbons contribute to ozone depletion. Rowland theorized that man made organic compound gases will decompose as a result of solar radiation in the stratosphere, releasing atoms of chlorine which react with oxygen (ozone) to form chlorine monoxide, and that they are individually able to destroy large numbers of ozone molecules. It was obvious that Rowland had a good idea of what was occurring at higher altitudes when he stated "...I knew that such a molecule could not remain inert in the atmosphere forever, if only because solar photochemistry at high altitudes would break it down". Rowland's research, first published in Nature magazine in 1974, initiated a scientific investigation of the problem. In 1978, a first ban on CFC-based aerosols in spray cans was issued in the United States. The actual production did however not stop and was soon on the old levels. It took till the 1980s to allow for a global regulation policy.

Rowland performed many measurements of the atmosphere. One experiment included collecting air samples at various cities and locations around the globe to determine CCl3F North-South mixing. By measuring the concentrations at different latitudes, Rowland was able to see that CCl3F was mixing between hemispheres quite rapidly. The same measurement was repeated 8 years later, and the results showed a steady increase in CCl3F concentrations. Rowland's work also showed how the density of the ozone layer varied by season increasing in November and decreasing until April where it levels out for the summer only to increase in November. Data gained throughout successive years showed that although the pattern was consistent, the overall ozone levels were dropping. Rowland and his colleagues interacted both with the public and the political side and suggested various solutions, which allowed to step wise reduce the CFC impact. CFC emissions were regulated first within Canada, the United States, Sweden and Norway. In the 1980s, the Vienna Agreement and the Montreal Protocol allowed for global regulation.

Awards and honors

Rowland won numerous awards for his work:
Tolman Medal, 1976
Elected to the American Academy of Arts and Sciences
Leo Szilard Lectureship Award, 1979
Tyler Prize for Environmental Achievement, 1983
Japan Prize, 1989
Honorary Doctor of Science (Sc.D.) degree from Whittier College, 1989
Peter Debye Award, 1993
Albert Einstein World Award of Science, 1994
Roger Revelle Medal, 1994
Nobel Prize in Chemistry, 1995
Elected to the American Philosophical Society (1995)
Golden Plate Award of the American Academy of Achievement, 1996
In 1998, the UC Irvine physical sciences building was named after Rowland. A bust of Rowland is visible in the lobby.
 Elected a Foreign Member of the Royal Society (ForMemRS) in 2004
 Mount Rowland in Antarctica was named after him in 2007
STEM Wing At Rutherford B. Hayes High School in Delaware, Ohio named in his honor

Personal life
Frank Rowland was the father of art historian Ingrid Rowland and Jeff Rowland. He had two granddaughters. After suffering from a short bout of ill health, Rowland died on March 10, 2012, of complications from Parkinson's disease. Upon hearing the news, renowned chemist and good friend Mario J. Molina stated: "Sherry was a prime influence throughout my career and had inspired me and many others to walk in the shadow of his greatness".

References

External links

Bibliography
Technical Reports: 
"Radiochemistry Research: Progress Report, October 1, 1974 to September 30, 1975", University of California, Irvine, United States Department of Energy (through predecessor agency the Atomic Energy Commission), (1975).
"Research in Chemical Kinetics: Progress Report, January 1, 1978 to September 30, 1978", University of California, Irvine, United States Department of Energy, (1978).
"Research in Chemical Kinetics. Annual Report, 1993", University of California, Irvine, United States Department of Energy, (1993).
"Research in Chemical Kinetics. Annual Report, 1994", University of California, Irvine, United States Department of Energy, (June 1, 1994).

Archival collections
F. Sherwood Rowland Papers. Special Collections and Archives, The UC Irvine Libraries, Irvine, California.
B. J. Finlayson-Pitts, D. R. Blake and A. R. "Ravi" Ravishankara, "F. Sherwood Rowland", Biographical Memoirs of the National Academy of Sciences (2022)

Other
CFCs, Ozone Depletion and Global Warming Freeview video interview with F.Sherwood Rowland provided by the Vega Science Trust.
 including the Nobel Lecture on December 8, 1995
UCI Nobel winner F. Sherwood 'Sherry' Rowland dies at 84 Orange County
Ozone layer scientist who 'saved the world' dies Guardian
Obituary in The Independent by Marcus Williamson
 

1927 births
2012 deaths
Albert Einstein World Award of Science Laureates
American chemists
American Nobel laureates
Neurological disease deaths in California
Deaths from Parkinson's disease
Foreign Members of the Royal Society
Members of the United States National Academy of Sciences
Nobel laureates in Chemistry
Ohio Wesleyan University alumni
People from Delaware, Ohio
Princeton University faculty
University of California, Irvine faculty
University of Chicago alumni
University of Kansas faculty
Atmospheric chemists
United States Navy personnel of World War II
United States Navy sailors
Members of the American Philosophical Society
Members of the National Academy of Medicine
Fellows of the American Physical Society